Mantas is a Lithuanian given name. Mantas is also a surname found in several European countries including Portugal, Spain, Greece, Germany, and others. The exact connection between the different regions of occurrence is presently unknown, although there is mounting  evidence in favor of a shared origin, at least in some cases. In Lithuania, people with the name include:

People with the given name
 Mantas Adomėnas (born 1972), philosopher
 Mantas Armalis (born 1992), professional ice hockey goaltender
 Mantas Dilys (born 1984), triple jumper
 Mantas Fridrikas (born 1988), footballer
 Mantas Jankavičius (born 1980), singer and actor
 Mantas Kalnietis (born 1986), basketball player
 Mantas Kuklys (born 1987), footballer
 Mantas Ruikis (born 1985), professional basketball player
 Mantas Samusiovas (born 1978), footballer
 Mantas Savėnas (born 1982), football midfielder
 Mantas Šilkauskas (born 1988), decathlete
 Mantas Strolia (born 1986), cross-country skier

People with the surname
 Herkus Mantas, leader of the Great Prussian Uprising

People known by the mononym
 Jeffrey Dunn (born 1961), British guitarist known as Mantas

Masculine given names
Lithuanian masculine given names